The Bolați (also: Drăxeni) is a left tributary of the river Rebricea in Romania. It flows into the Rebricea in Rateșu Cuzei.

References

Rivers of Romania
Rivers of Iași County
Rivers of Vaslui County